Microrhagus is a genus of beetles belonging to the family Eucnemidae.

The species of this genus are found in Europe, Japan and Northern America.

Species:
 Microrhagus audax Horn, 1886
  Microrhagus breviangularis Otto, 2015

References

Eucnemidae
Elateroidea genera